Giovanni Cariani (c. 1490–1547), also known as  Giovanni Busi or Il Cariani, was an Italian painter of the high-Renaissance, active in Venice and the Venetian mainland, including Bergamo, thought to be his native city.

Overview 

His father, also Giovanni Busi, was born in Fuipiano Al Brembo which is a hamlet of San Giovanni Bianco (Bergamo), and was appointed a local magistrate for the Venetian authorities. His son, also born in Fuipiano Al Brembo, is known to have lived in Venice starting in 1509, and may have trained with either Giovanni Bellini or Giorgione, and almost certainly was influenced by them. Though he worked often in Bergamo, he died in Venice in 1547. He was strongly influenced by Palma il Vecchio, but had a provincial love of scenery as seen in his Sacra conversazione with a youthful donor. While working in Bergamo (1517–1523), he likely overlapped with Lorenzo Lotto, who worked there from 1513-1525.

Cariani and the Courtesans 
The 1987 BBC Two television play Cariani and the Courtesans, written and directed by Leslie Megahey, presented a fictionalised account of the painter's time in Venice, with Cariani (Paul McGann) interacting with other historical characters, such as Tullia d'Aragona (Diana Quick), Marcantonio Raimondi (Simon Callow), and Francesco Albani (Michael Gough), with a brief "cameo" by Albrecht Dürer (Frederik de Groot), and narrated by Charles Gray. The narrative is woven around the painting of a number of his works, principally Four Courtesans and Three Gentlemen. Megahey had previously used the same narrative device on the 1979 production Schalcken the Painter.

Partial anthology of works 
 The Lute Player (c. 1514-1516) - Musee des Beaux Arts de Strasbourg
 Conversation between young woman and old man (1516) - Hermitage Museum, St. Petersburg. .
 Resurrection of Christ with two Donors (1520)  - Pinacoteca di Brera, Milan  .
 Pala di San Gottardo (1523) - Pinacoteca di Brera, Milan.
 Madonna Cucitrice (1525–28) - Galleria Nazionale d'Arte Antica, Rome.
 Finding the True Cross (1530) - Accademia Carrara, Bergamo.
 Lovers in a Landscape (1530) - Palazzo Venezia
 Lady Portrait (1530) - White Palace, Belgrade
 A Concert (1518–20) - National Gallery of Art, Washington DC 
 Sacra Conversazione with a Youthful Donor (1640) - National Gallery, London 
 Saint Agata (1516) - National Gallery, Ottawa, Canada.
 Portrait (1517) - National Gallery, London .

References 

 
 "Some Venetian Portraits in English Possession," Herbert Cook, The Burlington Magazine for Connoisseurs (1906) page 343-344.

External links
Painters of reality: the legacy of Leonardo and Caravaggio in Lombardy, an exhibition catalog from The Metropolitan Museum of Art (fully available online as PDF), which contains material on Cariani (see index)

1490s births
1547 deaths
15th-century Italian painters
Italian male painters
16th-century Italian painters
Painters from Bergamo
Italian Renaissance painters